Who Cares? (stylized in all caps) is the fourth studio album by English singer-songwriter Rex Orange County. It was released on 11 March 2022. The album was recorded in Amsterdam in just 12 days. The album is a collaboration with Dutch musician, Tim van Berkestijn, better known as Benny Sings, with contributions from American rapper Tyler, the Creator.

The album debuted at number 5 on the US Billboard 200 chart with 35,000 album equivalent units.

Critical reception

The album received a generally positive reception. Alexis Petridis of The Guardian rated the album two out of five stars, writing that the singer was playing it "gratingly safe". Also writing for The Guardian, Ammar Kalia described it as "sweet, unremarkable bedroom pop", which "offers plenty of hooks but lacks the depth to be truly memorable."

Track listing
All tracks written and produced by Alex "Rex Orange County" O'Connor and Benny Sings, except where noted.

Notes
 All tracks are stylized in all caps.

Personnel 
 Musicians
 Rex Orange County – vocals, arrangement (all tracks); keyboards (1), piano (1, 2, 10, 11), percussion (2, 9), synthesizer (6, 9), glockenspiel (8); acoustic guitar, drums (9)
 Benny Sings – arrangement (all tracks), background vocals (1, 5, 11), keyboards (1, 3, 4, 8, 11), programming (1, 2, 4–7, 9–11), bass (3–5, 7, 8), drum machine (3, 8–10), electric guitar (3, 4, 8), orchestra (3), piano (5, 7, 11)
 Joe MacLaren – bass (1, 2, 9–11)
 Tyler, the Creator – vocals (2)

Technical
 Joe LaPorta – mastering
 Ben Baptie – mixing (all tracks), engineering (5)
 Benny Sings – engineering
 Vic Wainstein – engineering (2)
 Tom Archer – mixing assistance

Artwork
 Bráulio Amado – illustrations
 Aidan Zamiri – photography

Charts

References 

2022 albums
Rex Orange County albums